Pérouse may refer to:
 Pérouse, Territoire de Belfort, a commune of the Franche-Comté region of France
 Perugia, a city in Italy, known as Pérouse in French
 Perouse (part of Rutesheim), a German municipality of Waldensian descent

See also 
Jean-François de Galaup, comte de La Pérouse
La Pérouse Strait, a strait between Sakhalin and Hokkaido
La Perouse, New South Wales, a suburb of Sydney, Australia